Liu Xueyi (born 6 July 1990) is a Chinese actor. He graduated from Central Academy of Drama in 2014.

Early life and education
Liu Xueyi was born on 6 July, 1990 in Qingdao, Shandong, China. He left home to study when he was a child. After studying dance for five years, he transferred to acting. He was admitted to Central Academy of Drama in 2010 and graduated in 2014.

Career
In 2013, Liu made his acting debut in the historical drama Shangguan Wan'er. In 2015, Liu starred in the historical drama The Legend Xiao Zhuang, playing Mongolian prince Ejei Khan.

In 2016, Liu starred in his first movie Ice Beauty where he played a loyal man in search for his lost lover. The same year, he gained recognition for his role as a morally ambiguous man in the hit fantasy action drama Noble Aspirations. He reunited shortly with his Noble Aspirations co-stars in the historical romance drama Legend of Dragon Pearl.

In 2018, Liu gained further popularity with his roles as Zhan Huang and Heavenly Emperor in the fantasy romance drama The Destiny of White Snake. He then starred in a spin-off of the drama, titled The Legend of Heavenly Emperor where he plays the main character.

In 2019, Liu starred in the mystery adventure drama The Lost Tomb 2: Explore with the Note, based on the novel Daomu Biji; playing Xie Yuchen. 

In 2020, Liu was cast in his first leading role in the historical romance drama Qing Luo. The same year, he starred in the  xianxia romance drama Love and Redemption.

In 2021, Liu starred in the xianxia romance drama Ancient Love Poetry.

Filmography

Film

Television series

References

External links
 

1990 births
Living people
Male actors from Qingdao
Central Academy of Drama alumni
21st-century Chinese male actors
Chinese male television actors